The , or TX, is a Japanese railway line operated by the third-sector company Metropolitan Intercity Railway Company, which links Akihabara Station in Chiyoda, Tokyo and Tsukuba Station in Tsukuba, Ibaraki. The route was inaugurated on 24 August 2005.

History

The new line was planned to relieve crowding on the Jōban Line operated by East Japan Railway Company (JR East), which had reached the limit of its capacity. However, with the economic downturn in Japan, the goal shifted to development along the line. This was facilitated by the enactment of the Special Measures Law in September 1989 which allowed the expedition of large housing projects as well as the expansion and construction of new and existing railway lines.

During the early stages of construction, the construction company (Japan Railway Construction, Transport and Technology Agency, or JRTT) as well as associated keiretsu and associates in the public sector purchased land situated on the alignment of the route. Eventually, all the lots would be joined continuously, completed or not, and their ownership transferred to the eventual railway operator, MIRC. Construction of all stations were centered around the theme of universal design.

Also, the initial plan called for a line from Tokyo Station to Moriya, but expenses forced the planners to start the line at Akihabara instead of Tokyo Station, and pressure from the government of Ibaraki Prefecture resulted in moving the extension from Moriya to Tsukuba into Phase I of the construction.

The original schedule called for the line to begin operating in 2000, but delays in construction pushed the opening date to summer 2005. The line eventually opened on 24 August 2005.

From the start of the revised timetable on 15 October 2012, new  services were introduced in the morning (inbound services) and evening (outbound services) peak periods.

In September 2013, a number of municipalities along the Tsukuba Express line in Ibaraki Prefecture submitted a proposal to complete the extension of the line to Tokyo Station at the same time as a new airport-to-airport line proposed as part of infrastructure improvements for the 2020 Summer Olympics.

The line made worldwide news in November 2017 when an apology was issued by Metropolitan Intercity Railway Company due to a train departing 20 seconds earlier than scheduled.

Driving
The Tsukuba Express is operated as a one-man train. The driver opens and closes the doors manually, but the operation is automatic. (ATO : Automatic Train Operation) The line has a top speed of 130 km/h (81 mph). The Rapid service has reduced the time required for the trip from Akihabara to Tsukuba from the previous 1 hour 30 minutes (by the Jōban Line, arriving in Tsuchiura, about 15 km from Tsukuba) or 70 minutes (by bus, under optimal traffic conditions) to 45 minutes. From Tokyo, the trip takes 50–55 minutes. No level crossings along the entire line.

Electrification and rolling stock
To prevent interference with the geomagnetic measurements of the Japan Meteorological Agency at its laboratory in Ishioka, the portion of the line from Moriya to Tsukuba operates on alternating current. As a result, three train models are used on the line; TX-1000 series DC-only trains, which can operate only between Akihabara and Moriya, TX-2000 series and TX-3000 series dual-voltage AC/DC trains, both of which can operate over the entire line.

Volume production of the line's initial rolling stock began in January 2004, following the completion in March 2003 of two (TX-1000 and TX-2000 series) six-car trains for trial operation and training. The full fleet of 84 TX-1000s (14 six-car trains) and 96 TX-2000s (16 six-car trains) was delivered by January 2005. New TX-3000 series trains built by Hitachi Rail entered service on 14 March 2020.

Operation
Metropolitan Intercity Railway Company offers four types of train services on the Tsukuba Express:
 : 
 : 
 : 
 :

Station list
Trains stop at stations marked "●" and skip stations marked "|". 

During the morning rush hour on weekdays, Semi Rapid trains bound for Akihabara make an additional stop at Rokuchō (marked "▲").

Ridership figures

See also
List of railway companies in Japan

References

External links
 Official Site

 
1067 mm gauge railways in Japan
2005 establishments in Japan
Articles containing video clips
Railway lines in Japan
Railway lines opened in 2005
Japanese third-sector railway lines